Spanish Riffs is an EP by Sugarsmack, released in 1995 through Yesha Records.

Track listing

Personnel 
John Adamian – drums
Chris Chandek – guitar
Hope Nicholls – vocals, saxophone
Aaron Pitkin – bass guitar

References 

1995 EPs
Sugarsmack albums